Jucimar José Teixeira (born 20 May 1990), commonly known as Alemão, is a Brazilian footballer who plays as a right back for Criciúma.

Club career
Born in Oliveira dos Brejinhos, Bahia, Alemão made his debut as a senior with Taboão da Serra in 2009, and subsequently served loan stints at German club VfL Nagold, Serrano-BA, Nacional-SP and Flamengo-SP. In January 2014, he joined União Barbarense after his contract with CATS expired.

On 4 December 2014 Alemão moved to Independente, becoming an undisputed starter for the side in their first Campeonato Paulista Série A2 ever. In May 2015, he signed for Série B club Bragantino.

Alemão made his professional debut on 16 May 2015, starting in a 1–0 home win against Paysandu. He became a regular starter for the club during the campaign, appearing in 26 matches.

On 15 September 2016, Alemão was loaned to Série A club Botafogo until the end of the year, with a buyout clause. He made his debut in the category on 1 October, starting in a 2–0 home win against Corinthians.

On 28 December 2016, Alemão was bought outright by Bota for a fee of R$ 600,000 (for 60% of his federative rights) and signed a three-year contract with the club.

However, a couple of weeks later on January 20, 2017, the contract with Botafogo was withdrawn and he signed with Sport Club Internacional on a three year contract. He joined   For the 2019 season, he joined Figueirense. Late in 2020, he signed with Água Santa for the Copa Paulista.

References

External links

1990 births
Living people
Sportspeople from Bahia
Brazilian footballers
Brazilian expatriate footballers
Association football defenders
Campeonato Brasileiro Série A players
Campeonato Brasileiro Série B players
K League 1 players
Clube Atlético Taboão da Serra players
Nacional Atlético Clube (SP) players
Associação Atlética Flamengo players
União Agrícola Barbarense Futebol Clube players
Clube Atlético Bragantino players
Botafogo de Futebol e Regatas players
Sport Club Internacional players
Paraná Clube players
Pohang Steelers players
Figueirense FC players
Londrina Esporte Clube players
Brazilian expatriate sportspeople in South Korea
Expatriate footballers in South Korea
VfL Nagold players